Bhabta is a railway station of the Sealdah-Lalgola line in the Eastern Railway zone of Indian Railways. The station is situated beside National Highway 12 at Bhabta village in Murshidabad district in the Indian state of West Bengal. It serves Bhabta and Beldanga I block areas. Total 14 trains including Lalogola Passengers and few EMUs stop in the station.

Electrification
The Krishnanagar– section, including Bhabta railway station was electrified in 2004. In 2010 the line became double tracked.

References

Railway stations in Murshidabad district
Sealdah railway division
Kolkata Suburban Railway stations